Robin Benz (born 7 November 1995) is a German footballer who plays as a goalkeeper for Rot-Weiß Oberhausen.

References

External links
 
 

1995 births
Living people
German footballers
Association football goalkeepers
VfL Bochum II players
TSG Sprockhövel players
KFC Uerdingen 05 players
Bonner SC players
Rot-Weiß Oberhausen players
3. Liga players
Regionalliga players